The 2009 Meistriliiga was the 19th season of the Meistriliiga, Estonia's premier football league. It started on 7 March 2009 and ended on 10 November 2009. Levadia won their seventh title.

Changes from the previous season
TVMK were disbanded after the end of the previous season. Hence Vaprus, who originally were to be directly relegated, faced Esiliiga side Paide Linnameeskond in a relegation play-off series for one spot in Meistriliiga 2009. With an aggregate 5–5, Paide Linnameeskond won the promotion play-off against Vaprus on the away goals rule and play their first season in Estonian top division. Tallinna Kalev, who originally were to participate in the relegation series, were spared.

Kuressaare earned promotion to the 2009 Meistriliiga after finishing in second place in the 2008 Esiliiga; champions Levadia II were not eligible to be promoted.

Maag Tammeka changed their name to Tammeka following the loss of a major sponsor.

Overview

League table

Relegation play-off
The ninth placed team of Meistriliiga and the runners-up of Esiliiga will compete in a two-legged relegation play-off for one spot in 2010 Meistriliiga.

Paide Linnameeskond wins 2–1 on aggregate and retains their spot in next season's Meistriliiga.

Results
Each team plays every opponent four times, twice at home and twice on the road, for a total of 36 games.

First half of season

Second half of season

Season statistics

Top scorers

Awards

Monthly awards

See also
 2009 Esiliiga

References

External links
 soccernet.ee 
 soccerassociation.com
 uefa.com

 

Meistriliiga seasons
1
Estonia
Estonia